Eugène Hyacinthe Laffillard (17 June 1779 – 5 January 1846) was a 19th-century French playwright and chansonnier.

A president of the Caveau Moderne in 1839, he participated to numerous literary publications such as the Courrier des Théâtres, La Nouveauté, the Observateur, the Voleur and La France littéraire.

He wrote many vaudevilles under his name or the pen name Eugène Décour. His plays were presented on the  most important Parisian stages of the 19th century: Théâtre du Vaudeville, Théâtre de la Gaîté, Théâtre du Panthéon, Théâtre de l'Ambigu-Comique, Théâtre des Variétés etc.

Works 

1802: L'Amour au village, opéra-vaudeville in 1 act
1802: Elina et Natalie, ou les Hongrois, drama in 3 acts, translated by Kotzebue
1803: La Sifflomanie, folie-vaudeville in 1 act and in prose, with Grétry
1804: Le Hameau de Chantilly ou Le Retour, folie-vaudeville in 1 act
1805: Un peu de méchanceté, comedy in 1 act and in verses, with André-Joseph Grétry
1806: Jacques Callot à Nancy, historical comedy in 1 act mingled with couplets
1806: Dix mille francs à gagner ou La fille perdue, arlequinade-vaudeville in 1 act
1806: Collin d'Harleville aux Champs-Élysées, comédie-vaudeville in 1 act, with Joseph Aude
1806: Le Mariage en poste, comedy in 1 act and in prose
1806: La Paix, impromptu vaudeville, with Aude
1807: Les Petits ricochets, imitation in 1 act and in comédie en vaudevilles, with Aude
1807: Arlequin sourd-muet, ou Cassandre opérateur, arlequinade en vaudeville, with Aude
1808: Mercure à Paris, arlequinade in 1 act, with Aude
1808: La Veille d'une grande fête, homage in 1 act and in verses, mingled with couplets, with Aude
1810: Épître à Désaugiers, l'un des convives du Caveau moderne
1813: Le Mannequin parlant, ou le Portrait de Dominique, arlequinade in 1 act, mingled with couplets, with Rochefort
1817: La Famille des Sans-Gêne ou Les amis du Château, tableau vivant in 1 act
1819: L'épée de Jeanne d'Arc, à propos burlesque et grivois in 1 act
1821: Jodelle ou Le berceau du théâtre, comédie-vaudeville in 1 act, with Edmond Rochefort and Hubert
1821: Le Dîner d'emprunt, ou les Gants et l'épaulette, vaudeville in 1 act, with Hubert
1822: Le Coq de village, tableau-vaudeville in 1 act, by Charles Simon Favart, revived in Theatre with changes, with Charles Hubert and Théodore Anne
1823: Les Mariages écossais, vaudeville in 1 act, with Jean-Baptiste Pellissier
1823: Les Précautions de ma tante, vaudeville in 1 act, with Hubert
1823: Les Petits maraudeurs, ou les Tambours en goguettes, tableau in 1 act mingled with vaudevilles, with Étienne-Junien de Champeaux and Gombault
1824: L'étourdi à la diète
1825: Les Sœurs de lait, scènes morales, mingled with couplets, with Alexandre Tardif and Gombault
1825: Le Couronnement au village, ou la Route de Reims, à propos mingled with couplets, with Paul Auguste Gombault
1825: Croisée à louer, ou Un jour à Reims, tableau mingled with vaudevilles, with Gombault
1825: Le Petit marchand, ou Chacun son commerce, vaudeville in 1 act, with Gombault and Auguste Imbert
1826: Le Béarnais, ou l'Enfance de Henri IV, with Jacques-André Jacquelin
1826: Monsieur et Madame, ou les Morts pour rire, folie-vaudeville in 1 act, with Pellissier
1826: La Saint-Charles au collège, with Jacques-André Jacquelin
1827: Les Acteurs par hasard, ou la Comédie au jardin, comedy in 1 act and in prose
1827: La petite somnambule ou Coquetterie et gourmandise, vaudeville in 3 tableaux, with Gomault
1828: La Muette des Pyrénées, play in 2 tableaux and in prose, mingled with couplets
1829: Finette, ou l'Adroite princesse, folie-féerie mingled with couplets, after tales by Charles Perrault, with Jules Dulong and Gombault
1831: M. Mayeux, ou Le Bossu à la mode, à propos de bosses in 3 tableaux, mingled with vaudevilles, with Emmanuel Lepeintre and Amable de Saint-Hilaire
1832: Caméloni, ou Je me venge, comedy in 1 act and in verses, with Gustave Dalby 
1833: La Citadelle d'Anvers, ou le Séjour et la conquête, à propos in 2 acts, mingled with couplets
1833: Le Savetier et l'apothicaire, folie-vaudeville, in 1 act and extravaganza, with Pierre-Joseph Charrin and Pierre Tournemine
1833: Le Gamin, folie-vaudeville in 3 acts, with Lubize
1835: Trois femmes, ou les Bonnes amies, vaudeville in 1 act, with Tradif and Tourret
1836: M. Bontemps, ou la Belle-mère et la bru, comedy in 1 act, mingled with couplets, with Gaspard Tourret
1836: Orgueil et ignorance, comédie-vaudeville in 1 act
1841: Au comte de Paris. Les Baptêmes

Bibliography 
 Jean Marie Querard, Les supercheries littéraires dévoilées, 1853, p. 208
 Georges d'Heylli, Dictionnaire des pseudonymes, 1869

19th-century French dramatists and playwrights
French chansonniers
Artists from Paris
1779 births
1846 deaths